General elections were held in Tokelau on 26 January 2023.

Background 
The previous elections were held in 2020.

Electoral system 
The General Fono consists of a Faipule (representative) and a Pulenuku (village mayor) elected in each of the three villages (Atafu, Fakaofo and Nukunonu). Each village also elects one delegate for every 100 residents. In total six MPs were elected from Nukunonu, and seven each from Atafu and Fakaofo. Voting uses a majoritarian system in which a candidate needs to obtain over 50% of the vote. If there are multiple delegates elected in a village, majority-at-large voting is used. Unlike previous elections, which saw Nukunonu use a different polling method from the other atolls, this was the first election where all three atolls used the same system.

Results

No elections were held for the  seats for Fakaofo as only three candidates were nominated for the three seats available.

Members of the fono and ministers were sworn in on 13 March 2023.

References 

Tokelau
Elections in Tokelau
General